Mount Saint Mary Academy is an all-girls private, Roman Catholic high school in Kenmore, New York within the Diocese of Buffalo.

Background
Mount Saint Mary Academy was established in 1927 by the Sisters of St. Mary of Namur.

Member of:
National Catholic Education Association.
Catholic Schools Administrators Association of New York State.
National Association of Secondary Schools Principals.
Bissnet.

The school has a student to faculty ratio of less than 10:1. The average SAT scores of students in the Class of 2008, all of whom take the SAT, are: Critical Reading: 560 Math: 551 Writing: 574. Their ACT Composite is 24.

References

External links
 

Catholic secondary schools in New York (state)
Educational institutions established in 1927
Girls' schools in New York (state)
High schools in Erie County, New York
1927 establishments in New York (state)